Lone Butte is an unincorporated community in the South Cariboo region of south central British Columbia, Canada. The place is adjacent to the butte of the same name and north of Green Lake.

Community
The post office, which opened in 1916, was originally called Fawn.

The hamlet was once larger than 100 Mile House to the northwest. The stockyards and lumber mills are long gone, as is the heritage hotel which burned down in 1998. The present log buildings comprise a pub, restaurant, and general store, which has a gas bar. A small park includes a caboose and water tower.

The area's economy is ranching and recreation based.

Railway
The northward advance of the Pacific Great Eastern Railway (PGE) rail head passed through Lone Butte in late April 1919.

Canadian National Railways have operated the BC Rail line since 2004.

See also
Interlakes

References

Unincorporated settlements in British Columbia
Geography of the Cariboo
Populated places in the Cariboo Regional District
Designated places in British Columbia